The Colorado Rockies' 2010 season, the franchise's 18th in Major League Baseball, was a season in American baseball.  It featured the club's attempt to make the postseason in consecutive seasons for the first time in the history of the franchise. The club finished 3rd overall in the NL West with a record of 83–79.

Offseason
January 4, 2010: Miguel Olivo was signed as a free agent by the Colorado Rockies.
January 31, 2010: Melvin Mora was signed as a free agent by the Colorado Rockies.

Ubaldo Jiménez no-hitter
On April 17, 2010, in a game against the Atlanta Braves at Turner Field in Atlanta, Rockies right-hander Ubaldo Jiménez threw the first no-hitter in the 18-year history of the franchise.  The Rockies won the game 4–0.  While Jiménez walked six Braves batters, he struck out seven.  Jiménez also contributed offensively, driving in one run.

Regular season

Season standings

National League West

Record vs. opponents

Transactions
August 26, 2010: Brad Hawpe was released by the Colorado Rockies.
August 31, 2010: Manny Delcarmen was traded by the Boston Red Sox to the Colorado Rockies for Chris Balcom-Miller (minors).
September 9, 2010: Taylor Buchholz was selected off waivers by the Toronto Blue Jays from the Colorado Rockies.
September 18, 2010: Octavio Dotel was traded by the Los Angeles Dodgers to the Colorado Rockies for a player to be named later. The Colorado Rockies sent Anthony Jackson (minors) (November 15, 2010) to the Los Angeles Dodgers to complete the trade.

Major League debuts
Batters:
Chris Nelson (Jun 19)
Michael McKenry (Sep 8)
Pitchers:
Matt Reynolds (Aug 19)
Samuel Deduno (Aug 27)
Edgmer Escalona (Sep 10)

Roster

Game log

|-  bgcolor="ffbbbb"
|- align="center" bgcolor="bbffbb"
| 1 || April 5 || @ Brewers || 5–3 || Jiménez (1–0) || Gallardo (0–1) || Morales (1) || 45,808 || 1–0
|- align="center" bgcolor="ffbbbb"
| 2 || April 6 || @ Brewers || 7–5 || Wolf (1–0) || Smith (0–1) || Hoffman (1) || 37,344 || 1–1
|- align="center" bgcolor="ffbbbb"
| 3 || April 7 || @ Brewers || 5–4 || Coffey (1–0) || Cook (0–1) || Hoffman (2) || 35,793 || 1–2
|- align="center" bgcolor="bbffbb"
| 4 || April 9 || Padres || 7–0 || de la Rosa (1–0) || Richard (0–1) || || 49,509 || 2–2
|- align="center" bgcolor="ffbbbb"
| 5 || April 10 || Padres || 5–4 (14) || Stauffer (1–0) || Corpas (0–1) || Bell (2) || 36,090 || 2–3
|- align="center" bgcolor="bbffbb"
| 6 || April 11 || Padres || 4–2 || Jiménez (2–0) || Garland (0–2) || Morales (2) || 39,576 || 3–3
|- align="center" bgcolor="bbffbb"
| 7 || April 13 || Mets || 11–3 || Smith (1–1) || Maine (0–1) || || 25,110 || 4–3
|- align="center" bgcolor="bbffbb"
| 8 || April 14 || Mets || 6–5 (10) || Flores (1–0) || Mejía (0–1) || || 26,310 || 5–3
|- align="center" bgcolor="ffbbbb"
| 9 || April 15 || Mets || 5–0 || Pelfrey (2–0) || de la Rosa (1–1) || || 26,195 || 5–4
|- align="center" bgcolor="ffbbbb"
| 10 || April 16 || @ Braves || 9–5 || Lowe (3–0) || Hammel (0–1) || || 27,692 || 5–5
|- align="center" bgcolor="bbffbb"
| 11 || April 17 || @ Braves || 4–0 || Jiménez (3–0) || Kawakami (0–2) || || 32,602 || 6–5
|- align="center" bgcolor="ffbbbb"
| 12 || April 18 || @ Braves || 4–3 || O'Flaherty (1–0) || Morales (0–1) || || 26,546 || 6–6
|- align="center" bgcolor="ffbbbb"
| 13 || April 19 || @ Nationals || 5–2 || Stammen (1–0) || Cook (0–2) || Capps (6) || 11,623 || 6–7
|- align="center" bgcolor="bbffbb"
| 14 || April 20 || @ Nationals || 10–4 || de la Rosa (2–1) || Olsen (0–1) || || 15,037 || 7–7
|- align="center" bgcolor="ffbbbb"
| 15 || April 21 || @ Nationals || 6–4 || Clippard (3–0) || Betancourt (0–1) || Capps (7) || 11,191 || 7–8
|- align="center" bgcolor="bbffbb"
| 16 || April 22 || @ Nationals || 2–0 || Jiménez (4–0) || Hernández (2–1) || Morales (3) || 15,518 || 8–8
|- align="center" bgcolor="bbbbbb"
| – || April 23 || Marlins || colspan=6 | Postponed (rain/cold) Rescheduled for April 24
|- align="center" bgcolor="ffbbbb"
| 17 || April 24 || Marlins || 4–1 || Nolasco (2–0) || Smith (1–2) || Núñez (4) || || 8–9
|- align="center" bgcolor="bbffbb"
| 18 || April 24 || Marlins || 8–1 || Cook (1–2) || Robertson (2–1) || || 31,560 || 9–9
|- align="center" bgcolor="bbffbb"
| 19 || April 25 || Marlins || 8–4 || de la Rosa (3–1) || Volstad (1–2) || || 35,883 || 10–9
|- align="center" bgcolor="ffbbbb"
| 20 || April 26 || Diamondbacks || 5–3 || Haren (3–1) || Hammel (0–2) || Qualls (5) || 20,308 || 10–10
|- align="center" bgcolor="bbffbb"
| 21 || April 27 || Diamondbacks || 12–1 || Jiménez (5–0) || Jackson (1–2) || || 24,112 || 11–10
|- align="center" bgcolor="ffbbbb"
| 22 || April 28 || Diamondbacks || 12–11 (10) || Howry (1–0) || Morales (0–2) || Gutiérrez (1) || 23,773 || 11–11
|- align="center" bgcolor="ffbbbb"
| 23 || April 30 || @ Giants || 5–2 || Zito (4–0) || Cook (1–3) || Affeldt (2) || 37,144 || 11–12
|-

|-  bgcolor="ffbbbb"
|- align="center" bgcolor="ffbbbb"
| 24 || May 1 || @ Giants || 6–1 || Cain (1–1) || Rogers (0–1) || || 39,211 || 11–13
|- align="center" bgcolor="bbffbb"
| 25 || May 2 || @ Giants || 4–1 || Chacín (1–0) || Sánchez (2–2) || || 41,831 || 12–13
|- align="center" bgcolor="bbffbb"
| 26 || May 3 || @ Padres || 5–2 || Jiménez (6–0) || Correia (4–2) || || 15,052 || 13–13
|- align="center" bgcolor="ffbbbb"
| 27 || May 4 || @ Padres || 3–2 || Bell (2–0) || Morales (0–3) || || 16,329 || 13–14
|- align="center" bgcolor="bbffbb"
| 28 || May 5 || @ Padres || 6–5 (12) || Corpas (1–1) || Stauffer (2–1) || || 17,121 || 14–14
|- align="center" bgcolor="ffbbbb"
| 29 || May 7 || @ Dodgers || 6–5 || Weaver (1–1) || Daley (0–1) || Broxton (2) || 40,567 || 14–15
|- align="center" bgcolor="bbffbb"
| 30 || May 8 || @ Dodgers || 8–0 || Chacín (2–0) || Haeger (0–4) || || 42,287 || 15–15
|- align="center" bgcolor="ffbbbb"
| 31 || May 9 || @ Dodgers || 2–0 || Kershaw (2–2) || Jiménez (6–1) || Broxton (3) || 40,718 || 15–16
|- align="center" bgcolor="ffbbbb"
| 32 || May 10 || Phillies || 9–5 || Báez (1–1) || Corpas (1–2) || || 30,403 || 15–17
|- align="center" bgcolor="bbbbbb"
| – || May 11 || Phillies || colspan=6 | Postponed (rain/cold) Rescheduled for May 12
|- align="center" bgcolor="bbffbb"
| 33 || May 12 || Phillies || 4–3 (10) || Beimel (1–0) || Durbin (0–1) || || 23,475 || 16–17
|- align="center" bgcolor="bbbbbb"
| – || May 12 || Phillies || colspan=6 | Postponed (rain/cold) Rescheduled for September 2
|- align="center" bgcolor="ffbbbb"
| 34 || May 13 || Nationals || 14–6 (8) || Slaten (1–0) || Chacín (2–1) || || 20,795 || 16–18
|- align="center" bgcolor="bbbbbb"
| – || May 14 || Nationals || colspan=6 | Postponed (rain) Rescheduled for May 15
|- align="center" bgcolor="bbffbb"
| 35 || May 15 || Nationals || 6–2 || Jiménez (7–1) || Hernández (4–2) || || 29,111 || 17–18
|- align="center" bgcolor="bbffbb"
| 36 || May 15 || Nationals || 4–3 || Hammel (1–2) || Burnett (0–1) || Corpas (1) || 35,258 || 18–18
|- align="center" bgcolor="bbffbb"
| 37 || May 16 || Nationals || 2–1 || Belisle (1–0) || Clippard (7–2) || Corpas (2) || 42,874 || 19–18
|- align="center" bgcolor="ffbbbb"
| 38 || May 17 || @ Cubs || 4–2 (11) || Marshall (3–2) || Belisle (1–1) || || 35,760 || 19–19
|- align="center" bgcolor="ffbbbb"
| 39 || May 18 || @ Cubs || 6–2 || Silva (5–0) || Chacín (2–2) || || 37,029 || 19–20
|- align="center" bgcolor="ffbbbb"
| 40 || May 19 || @ Astros || 7–3 || Lyon (3–1) || Rogers (0–2) || || 25,200 || 19–21
|- align="center" bgcolor="bbffbb"
| 41 || May 20 || @ Astros || 4–0 || Jiménez (8–1) || Oswalt (2–6) || || 25,932 || 20–21
|- align="center" bgcolor="ffbbbb"
| 42 || May 21 || @ Royals || 9–2 || Bannister (3–3) || Hammel (1–3) || || 24,807 || 20–22
|- align="center" bgcolor="bbffbb"
| 43 || May 22 || @ Royals || 3–0 || Francis (1–0) || Davies (3–3) || Corpas (3) || 20,907 || 21–22
|- align="center" bgcolor="bbffbb"
| 44 || May 23 || @ Royals || 11–7 || Rogers (1–2) || Greinke (1–5) || || 21,876 || 22–22
|- align="center" bgcolor="bbffbb"
| 45 || May 25 || Diamondbacks || 3–2 || Chacín (3–2) || Kennedy (3–3) || Corpas (4) || 28,370 || 23–22
|- align="center" bgcolor="bbffbb"
| 46 || May 26 || Diamondbacks || 7–3 || Jiménez (9–1) || López (2–3) || || 26,320 || 24–22
|- align="center" bgcolor="bbffbb"
| 47 || May 27 || Diamondbacks || 8–2 || Hammel (2–3) || Haren (5–4) || || 28,353 || 25–22
|- align="center" bgcolor="ffbbbb"
| 48 || May 28 || Dodgers || 5–4 || Monasterios (2–0) || Francis (1–1) || Broxton (12) || 40,162 || 25–23
|- align="center" bgcolor="bbffbb"
| 49 || May 29 || Dodgers || 11–3 || Cook (2–3) || Kuroda (5–3) || || 43,261 || 26–23
|- align="center" bgcolor="ffbbbb"
| 50 || May 30 || Dodgers || 4–3 || Kershaw (5–3) || Chacín (3–3) || Broxton (13) || 48,682 || 26–24
|- align="center" bgcolor="bbffbb"
| 51 || May 31 || @ Giants || 4–0 || Jiménez (10–1) || Lincecum (5–2) || || 42,465 || 27–24
|-

|-  bgcolor="ffbbbb"
|- align="center" bgcolor="bbffbb"
| 52 || June 1 || @ Giants || 2–1 (11) || Betancourt (1–1) || Casilla (1–1) || Corpas (5) || 31,198 || 28–24
|- align="center" bgcolor="ffbbbb"
| 53 || June 2 || @ Giants || 4–1 || Cain (4–4) || Francis (1–2) || Wilson (13) || 30,697 || 28–25
|- align="center" bgcolor="ffbbbb"
| 54 || June 4 || @ Diamondbacks || 7–6 || Qualls (1–2) || Corpas (1–3) || || 25,290 || 28–26
|- align="center" bgcolor="ffbbbb"
| 55 || June 5 || @ Diamondbacks || 4–3 || Willis (2–2) || Chacín (3–4) || Qualls (10) || 28,138 || 28–27
|- align="center" bgcolor="bbffbb"
| 56 || June 6 || @ Diamondbacks || 3–2 || Jiménez (11–1) || López (2–4) || Corpas (6) || 20,793 || 29–27
|- align="center" bgcolor="bbffbb"
| 57 || June 7 || Astros || 5–1 || Hammel (3–3) || Rodríguez (3–8) || Corpas (7) || 28,251 || 30–27
|- align="center" bgcolor="ffbbbb"
| 58 || June 8 || Astros || 4–3 || López (3–0) || Belisle (1–2) || Lindstrom (14) || 26,201 || 30–28
|- align="center" bgcolor="ffbbbb"
| 59 || June 9 || Astros || 6–2 (10) || Lyon (5–1) || Belisle (1–3) || || 27,114 || 30–29
|- align="center" bgcolor="ffbbbb"
| 60 || June 10 || Astros || 5–4 || Oswalt (4–8) || Chacín (3–5) || Lyon (1) || 28,329 || 30–30
|- align="center" bgcolor="bbffbb"
| 61 || June 11 || Blue Jays || 5–3 (6) || Jiménez (12–1) || Romero (5–3) || || 31,101 || 31–30
|- align="center" bgcolor="bbffbb"
| 62 || June 12 || Blue Jays || 1–0 || Hammel (4–3) || Morrow (4–5) || Corpas (8) || 26,304 || 32–30
|- align="center" bgcolor="bbffbb"
| 63 || June 13 || Blue Jays || 10–3 || Francis (2–2) || Litsch (0–1) || || 32,084 || 33–30
|- align="center" bgcolor="ffbbbb"
| 64 || June 15 || @ Twins || 9–3 || Pavano (7–6) || Cook (2–4) || || 39,812 || 33–31
|- align="center" bgcolor="ffbbbb"
| 65 || June 16 || @ Twins || 2–1 || Baker (6–5) || Chacín (3–6) || Rauch (17) || 40,814 || 33–32
|- align="center" bgcolor="bbffbb"
| 66 || June 17 || @ Twins || 5–1 || Jiménez (13–1) || Liriano (6–4) || || 40,741 || 34–32
|- align="center" bgcolor="bbffbb"
| 67 || June 18 || Brewers || 2–0 || Hammel (5–3) || Parra (1–5) || Corpas (9) || 32,340 || 35–32
|- align="center" bgcolor="bbffbb"
| 68 || June 19 || Brewers || 8–7 || Belisle (2–3) || Braddock (1–1) || Betancourt (1) || 39,192 || 36–32
|- align="center" bgcolor="ffbbbb"
| 69 || June 20 || Brewers || 6–1 || Hoffman (2–4) || Corpas (1–4) || || 46,511 || 36–33
|- align="center" bgcolor="bbffbb"
| 70 || June 22 || Red Sox || 2–1 || Chacín (4–6) || Lester (8–3) || Belisle (1) || 48,112 || 37–33
|- align="center" bgcolor="bbffbb"
| 71 || June 23 || Red Sox || 8–6 || Corpas (2–4) || Papelbon (2–4) || || 48,243 || 38–33
|- align="center" bgcolor="ffbbbb"
| 72 || June 24 || Red Sox || 13–11 (10) || Papelbon (3–4) || Street (0–1) || || 48,582 || 38–34
|- align="center" bgcolor="bbffbb"
| 73 || June 25 || @ Angels || 4–3 (11) || Belisle (3–3) || Rodríguez (0–1) || Corpas (10) || 37,228 || 39–34
|- align="center" bgcolor="ffbbbb"
| 74 || June 26 || @ Angels || 4–2 || Saunders (6–8) || Cook (2–5) || Fuentes (13) || 39,225 || 39–35
|- align="center" bgcolor="ffbbbb"
| 75 || June 27 || @ Angels || 10–3 || Santana (8–5) || Chacín (4–7) || || 37,314 || 39–36
|- align="center" bgcolor="bbffbb"
| 76 || June 28 || @ Padres || 10–6 || Jiménez (14–1) || Correia (5–6) || || 21,018 || 40–36
|- align="center" bgcolor="bbffbb"
| 77 || June 29 || @ Padres || 6–3 || Hammel (6–3) || LeBlanc (4–6) || Street (1) || 21,196 || 41–36
|- align="center" bgcolor="ffbbbb"
| 78 || June 30 || @ Padres || 13–3 || Richard (6–4) || Francis (2–3) || || 24,519 || 41–37
|-

|-  bgcolor="ffbbbb"
|- align="center" bgcolor="bbffbb"
| 79 || July 1 || Giants || 7–3 || Cook (3–5) || Bumgarner (0–2) || || 32,134 || 42–37
|- align="center" bgcolor="bbffbb"
| 80 || July 2 || Giants || 6–3 || Chacín (5–7) || Lincecum (8–4) || Street (2) || 48,127 || 43–37
|- align="center" bgcolor="ffbbbb"
| 81 || July 3 || Giants || 11–8 || Bautista (2–0) || Corpas (2–5) || Wilson (22) || 49,271 || 43–38
|- align="center" bgcolor="bbffbb"
| 82 || July 4 || Giants || 4–3 (15) || Flores (2–0) || Mota (0–3) || || 35,274 || 44–38
|- align="center" bgcolor="bbffbb"
| 83 || July 6 || Cardinals || 12–9 || Corpas (3–5) || Franklin (3–1) || || 32,922 || 45–38
|- align="center" bgcolor="bbffbb"
| 84 || July 7 || Cardinals || 8–7 || Street (1–1) || MacLane (0–1) || || 33,251 || 46–38
|- align="center" bgcolor="bbffbb"
| 85 || July 8 || Cardinals || 4–2 || Jiménez (15–1) || Carpenter (9–3) || Street (3) || 37,456 || 47–38
|- align="center" bgcolor="bbffbb"
| 86 || July 9 || Padres || 10–8 || Belisle (4–3) || Gregerson (2–5) || Street (4) || 36,123 || 48–38
|- align="center" bgcolor="bbffbb"
| 87 || July 10 || Padres || 4–2 || Hammel (7–3) || LeBlanc (4–7) || Street (5) || 45,069 || 49–38
|- align="center" bgcolor="ffbbbb"
| 88 || July 11 || Padres || 9–7 || Gregerson (3–5) || Belisle (4–4) || Bell (24) || 40,460 || 49–39
|- align="center" bgcolor="ffbbbb"
| 89 || July 16 || @ Reds || 3–2 || Arroyo (10–4) || Hammel (7–4) || Cordero (25) || 37,188 || 49–40
|- align="center" bgcolor="ffbbbb"
| 90 || July 17 || @ Reds || 8–1 || Volquez (1–0) || de la Rosa (3–2) || || 41,300 || 49–41
|- align="center" bgcolor="bbffbb"
| 91 || July 18 || @ Reds || 1–0 || Cook (4–5) || Wood (0–1) || Street (6) || 25,159 || 50–41
|- align="center" bgcolor="ffbbbb"
| 92 || July 19 || @ Marlins || 9–8 || Mariñez (1–0) || Street (1–2) || || 16,144 || 50–42
|- align="center" bgcolor="bbffbb"
| 93 || July 20 || @ Marlins || 10–0 || Francis (3–3) || Robertson (6–8) || || 16,012 || 51–42
|- align="center" bgcolor="ffbbbb"
| 94 || July 21 || @ Marlins || 5–2 || Nolasco (10–7) || Hammel (7–5) || Núñez (23) || 18,332 || 51–43
|- align="center" bgcolor="ffbbbb"
| 95 || July 22 || @ Marlins || 3–2 || Núñez (4–2) || Chacín (5–8) || || 29,102 || 51–44
|- align="center" bgcolor="ffbbbb"
| 96 || July 23 || @ Phillies || 6–0 || Halladay (11–8) || Cook (4–6) || || 45,265 || 51–45
|- align="center" bgcolor="ffbbbb"
| 97 || July 24 || @ Phillies || 10–2 || Kendrick (6–4) || Jiménez (15–2) || || 44,781 || 51–46
|- align="center" bgcolor="ffbbbb"
| 98 || July 25 || @ Phillies || 4–3 || Madson (3–1) || Beimel (1–1) || Lidge (9) || 44,726 || 51–47
|- align="center" bgcolor="ffbbbb"
| 99 || July 26 || @ Phillies || 5–4 || Blanton (4–6) || Hammel (7–6) || Lidge (10) || 44,838 || 51–48
|- align="center" bgcolor="ffbbbb"
| 100 || July 27 || Pirates || 4–2 || Duke (5–9) || de la Rosa (3–3) || Dotel (21) || 46,608 || 51–49
|- align="center" bgcolor="ffbbbb"
| 101 || July 28 || Pirates || 6–2 || Gallagher (1–0) || Cook (4–7) || || 35,128 || 51–50
|- align="center" bgcolor="bbffbb"
| 102 || July 29 || Pirates || 9–3 || Jiménez (16–2) || Maholm (6–9) || || 34,158 || 52–50
|- align="center" bgcolor="bbffbb"
| 103 || July 30 || Cubs || 17–2 || Francis (4–3) || Dempster (8–8) || || 40,189 || 53–50
|- align="center" bgcolor="bbffbb"
| 104 || July 31 || Cubs || 6–5 || Street (2–2) || Marshall (6–3) || || 48,065 || 54–50
|-

|-  bgcolor="ffbbbb"
|- align="center" bgcolor="bbffbb"
| 105 || August 1 || Cubs || 8–7 || de la Rosa (4–3) || Silva (10–5) || || 38,256 || 55–50
|- align="center" bgcolor="ffbbbb"
| 106 || August 3 || Giants || 10–0 || Sánchez (8–6) || Cook (4–8) || || 43,549 || 55–51
|- align="center" bgcolor="bbffbb"
| 107 || August 4 || Giants || 6–1 || Jiménez (17–2) || Bumgarner (4–4) || || 37,278 || 56–51
|- align="center" bgcolor="ffbbbb"
| 108 || August 5 || @ Pirates || 5–1 || McDonald (1–1) || Francis (4–4) || || 17,131 || 56–52
|- align="center" bgcolor="bbffbb"
| 109 || August 6 || @ Pirates || 6–3 || Hammel (8–6) || Park (2–2) || Street (7) || 30,711 || 57–52
|- align="center" bgcolor="ffbbbb"
| 110 || August 7 || @ Pirates || 8–7 (10) || Gallagher (2–0) || Street (2–3) || || 38,147 || 57–53
|- align="center" bgcolor="bbffbb"
| 111 || August 8 || @ Pirates || 8–4 || Rogers (2–2) || Maholm (7–10) || || 22,716 || 58–53
|- align="center" bgcolor="ffbbbb"
| 112 || August 10 || @ Mets || 1–0 || Pelfrey (11–6) || Jiménez (17–3) || Rodríguez (25) || 30,036 || 58–54
|- align="center" bgcolor="bbffbb"
| 113 || August 11 || @ Mets || 6–2 || Belisle (5–4) || Takahashi (7–6) || || 30,554 || 59–54
|- align="center" bgcolor="ffbbbb"
| 114 || August 12 || @ Mets || 4–0 || Santana (10–6) || Hammel (8–7) || || 32,272 || 59–55
|- align="center" bgcolor="bbffbb"
| 115 || August 13 || Brewers || 5–4 || Buchholz (1–0) || Loe (2–3) || Street (8) || 39,142 || 60–55
|- align="center" bgcolor="ffbbbb"
| 116 || August 14 || Brewers || 5–4 (10) || Axford (7–1) || Street (2–4) || || 45,264 || 60–56
|- align="center" bgcolor="bbffbb"
| 117 || August 15 || Brewers || 6–5 || Betancourt (2–1) || Hoffman (2–6) || || 48,133 || 61–56
|- align="center" bgcolor="ffbbbb"
| 118 || August 17 || @ Dodgers || 6–0 || Kershaw (11–7) || Chacín (5–9) || || 49,540 || 61–57
|- align="center" bgcolor="bbffbb"
| 119 || August 18 || @ Dodgers || 3–2 (10) || Betancourt (3–1) || Dotel (2–3) || Street (9) || 44,268 || 62–57
|- align="center" bgcolor="ffbbbb"
| 120 || August 19 || @ Dodgers || 2–0 || Lilly (7–8) || de la Rosa (4–4) || || 45,104 || 62–58
|- align="center" bgcolor="ffbbbb"
| 121 || August 20 || @ Diamondbacks || 4–3 (10) || Heilman (4–4) || Beimel (1–2) || || 26,294 || 62–59
|- align="center" bgcolor="ffbbbb"
| 122 || August 21 || @ Diamondbacks || 3–1 || Enright (4–2) || Jiménez (17–4) || Gutiérrez (4) || 37,631 || 62–60
|- align="center" bgcolor="bbffbb"
| 123 || August 22 || @ Diamondbacks || 1–0 || Chacín (6–9) || Heilman (4–5) || Street (10) || 30,397 || 63–60
|- align="center" bgcolor="bbffbb"
| 124 || August 23 || Braves || 5–4 || Betancourt (4–1) || Venters (4–1) || Street (11) || 34,172 || 64–60
|- align="center" bgcolor="bbffbb"
| 125 || August 24 || Braves || 5–2 || de la Rosa (5–4) || Lowe (11–12) || Street (12) || 34,485 || 65–60
|- align="center" bgcolor="bbffbb"
| 126 || August 25 || Braves || 12–10 || Belisle (6–4) || Venters (4–2) || || 27,675 || 66–60
|- align="center" bgcolor="ffbbbb"
| 127 || August 27 || Dodgers || 6–2 || Broxton (5–4) || Jiménez (17–5) || Kuo (6) || 41,964 || 66–61
|- align="center" bgcolor="bbffbb"
| 128 || August 28 || Dodgers || 5–3 || Chacín (7–9) || Billingsley (10–8) || || 45,322 || 67–61
|- align="center" bgcolor="bbffbb"
| 129 || August 29 || Dodgers || 10–5 || Hammel (9–7) || Lilly (8–9) || || 38,343 || 68–61
|- align="center" bgcolor="bbffbb"
| 130 || August 30 || @ Giants || 2–1 || Betancourt (5–1) || Wilson (3–2) || Street (13) || 30,224 || 69–61
|- align="center" bgcolor="ffbbbb"
| 131 || August 31 || @ Giants || 5–2 || Affeldt (4–3) || Belisle (6–5) || Wilson (37) || 31,099 || 69–62
|-

|-  bgcolor="ffbbbb"
|- align="center" bgcolor="ffbbbb"
| 132 || September 1 || @ Giants || 2–1 || Lincecum (12–9) || Jiménez (17–6) || Wilson (38) || 31,186 || 69–63
|- align="center" bgcolor="ffbbbb"
| 133 || September 2 || Phillies || 12–11 || Bastardo (1–0) || Delcarmen (3–3) || Lidge (19) || 30,179 || 69–64
|- align="center" bgcolor="bbffbb"
| 134 || September 3 || @ Padres || 4–3 || Cook (5–8) || Luebke (0–1) || Street (14) || 21,877 || 70–64
|- align="center" bgcolor="bbffbb"
| 135 || September 4 || @ Padres || 6–2 || Hammel (10–7) || Garland (13–10) || || 26,168 || 71–64
|- align="center" bgcolor="bbffbb"
| 136 || September 5 || @ Padres || 4–2 || de la Rosa (6–4) || Stauffer (3–3) || Street (15) || 23,250 || 72–64
|- align="center" bgcolor="bbffbb"
| 137 || September 6 || Reds || 10–5 || Jiménez (18–6) || Bray (0–2) || || 40,237 || 73–64
|- align="center" bgcolor="bbffbb"
| 138 || September 7 || Reds || 4–3 || Chacín (8–9) || Cueto (12–5) || Street (16) || 29,164 || 74–64
|- align="center" bgcolor="bbffbb"
| 139 || September 8 || Reds || 9–2 || Cook (6–8) || Arroyo (14–10) || || 28,271 || 75–64
|- align="center" bgcolor="bbffbb"
| 140 || September 9 || Reds || 6–5 || Belisle (7–5) || Masset (3–4) || Street (17) || 25,213 || 76–64
|- align="center" bgcolor="bbffbb"
| 141 || September 10 || Diamondbacks || 13–4 || de la Rosa (7–4) || Saunders (8–15) || || 37,265 || 77–64
|- align="center" bgcolor="bbffbb"
| 142 || September 11 || Diamondbacks || 2–1 || Reynolds (1–0) || López (5–14) || Street (18) || 48,023 || 78–64
|- align="center" bgcolor="bbffbb"
| 143 || September 12 || Diamondbacks || 4–2 || Street (3–4) || Demel (1–1) || || 41,504 || 79–64
|- align="center" bgcolor="ffbbbb"
| 144 || September 13 || Padres || 6–4 || Frieri (1–1) || Francis (4–5) || Bell (41) || 34,089 || 79–65
|- align="center" bgcolor="ffbbbb"
| 145 || September 14 || Padres || 7–6 || Garland (14–11) || Hammel (10–8) || Bell (42) || 40,532 || 79–66
|- align="center" bgcolor="bbffbb"
| 146 || September 15 || Padres || 9–6 || de la Rosa (8–4) || Richard (12–8) || Street (19) || 30,218 || 80–66
|- align="center" bgcolor="bbffbb"
| 147 || September 17 || @ Dodgers || 7–5 || Jiménez (19–6) || Kuroda (10–13) || Street (20) || 38,449 || 81–66
|- align="center" bgcolor="bbffbb"
| 148 || September 18 || @ Dodgers || 12–2 || Chacín (9–9) || Ely (4–8) || || 40,191 || 82–66
|- align="center" bgcolor="ffbbbb"
| 149 || September 19 || @ Dodgers || 7–6 (11) || Sherrill (2–2) || Delcarmen (3–4) || || 37,402 || 82–67
|- align="center" bgcolor="ffbbbb"
| 150 || September 21 || @ Diamondbacks || 3–1 || Saunders (9–16) || de la Rosa (8–5) || Gutiérrez (11) || 37,460 || 82–68
|- align="center" bgcolor="ffbbbb"
| 151 || September 22 || @ Diamondbacks || 8–4 || López (7–14) || Jiménez (19–7) || Demel (2) || 29,903 || 82–69
|- align="center" bgcolor="ffbbbb"
| 152 || September 23 || @ Diamondbacks || 10–9 || Carrasco (3–2) || Francis (4–6) || Gutiérrez (12) || 30,093 || 82–70
|- align="center" bgcolor="ffbbbb"
| 153 || September 24 || Giants || 2–1 || Lincecum (15–10) || Chacín (9–10) || Wilson (45) || 49,071 || 82–71
|- align="center" bgcolor="bbffbb"
| 154 || September 25 || Giants || 10–9 (10) || Street (4–4) || Wilson (3–3) || || 43,402 || 83–71
|- align="center" bgcolor="ffbbbb"
| 155 || September 26 || Giants || 4–2 || Cain (13–10) || de la Rosa (8–6) || || 32,594 || 83–72
|- align="center" bgcolor="ffbbbb"
| 156 || September 27 || Dodgers || 3–1 || Lilly (9–12) || Jiménez (19–8) || Kuo (11) || 32,085 || 83–73
|- align="center" bgcolor="ffbbbb"
| 157 || September 28 || Dodgers || 9–7 || Belisario (3–1) || Dotel (3–4) || Jansen (3) || 34,430 || 83–74
|- align="center" bgcolor="ffbbbb"
| 158 || September 29 || Dodgers || 7–6 || Troncoso (2–3) || Chacín (9–11) || Belisario (2) || 33,296 || 83–75
|- align="center" bgcolor="ffbbbb"
| 159 || September 30 || @ Cardinals || 6–1 || Carpenter (16–9) || Hammel (10–9) || || 36,739 || 83–76
|-

|-  bgcolor="ffbbbb"
|- align="center" bgcolor="ffbbbb"
| 160 || October 1 || @ Cardinals || 3–0 || Westbrook (10–11) || de la Rosa (8–7) || Franklin (27) || 36,293 || 83–77
|- align="center" bgcolor="ffbbbb"
| 161 || October 2 || @ Cardinals || 1–0 (11) || Motte (4–2) || Morales (0–4) || || 39,633 || 83–78
|- align="center" bgcolor="ffbbbb"
| 162 || October 3 || @ Cardinals || 6–1 || Suppan (3–8) || Rogers (2–3) || || 42,409 || 83–79
|-

Player stats

Batting

Starters by position 
Note: Pos = Position; G = Games played; AB = At bats; H = Hits; Avg. = Batting average; HR = Home runs; RBI = Runs batted in

Other batters 
Note: G = Games played; AB = At bats; H = Hits; Avg. = Batting average; HR = Home runs; RBI = Runs batted in

Pitching

Starting pitchers 
Note: G = Games pitched; IP = Innings pitched; W = Wins; L = Losses; ERA = Earned run average; SO = Strikeouts

Other pitchers 
Note: G = Games pitched; IP = Innings pitched; W = Wins; L = Losses; ERA = Earned run average; SO = Strikeouts

Relief pitchers 
Note: G = Games pitched; W = Wins; L = Losses; SV = Saves; ERA = Earned run average; SO = Strikeouts

Farm system

References

External links
2010 Colorado Rockies season at Baseball Reference
2010 Colorado Rockies season Official Site

Colorado Rockies seasons
Colorado Rockies
Colorado Rockies
2010s in Denver